Kenneth Paul Dolan (born April 16, 1966) is a former Canadian national team and Canadian Soccer League goalkeeper. He is currently the colour commentator for the Vancouver Whitecaps FC on MLS on TSN. He was inducted into the Canadian Soccer Hall of Fame in 2004.

Club career
Dolan had a trial with Notts County of England's Football League following the 1986 World Cup, but returned to Canada to continue his career in the Canadian Soccer League, playing for Vancouver 86ers and Hamilton Steelers and winning the CSL championship with the 86ers in 1990 and 1991.

International career
Dolan was a member of Canada's Youth team in Trinidad and Tobago in 1984 that qualified for the FIFA World Youth Championship in the Soviet Union in 1985.

He made his senior debut in an October 1984 friendly match against Cyprus and burst on to the international scene in 1986, when he played for Canada in the opening game of the World Cup in Mexico against France. He held the famous French team scoreless until the 79th minute when Jean Pierre Papin gave France a narrow 1–0 victory.

He earned a total of 53 caps and has represented Canada in 15 FIFA World Cup qualification matches  in four World Cup qualifying campaigns. He also played at the inaugural 1989 FIFA Futsal World Championship.

His final international was a November 1997 World Cup qualification match against Costa Rica, a game after which Alex Bunbury, Geoff Aunger, Frank Yallop and Colin Miller also said farewell to the national team.

In 2004, Dolan was inducted into the Canadian Soccer Hall of Fame.

Coaching
After retiring, Dolan became one of Canada's goalkeeper coaches at both CONCACAF Gold Cup tournaments and World Cup qualification games.

Honours
 Canadian Soccer League:  1990, 1991

References

External links
 / Canada Soccer Hall of Fame
 

1966 births
Living people
Futsal goalkeepers
Soccer players from Ottawa
Canadian sportspeople of Irish descent
Association football goalkeepers
Canadian soccer players
Canadian expatriate soccer players
Canadian expatriate sportspeople in the United States
Canada men's international soccer players
Canadian men's futsal players 
1986 FIFA World Cup players
1991 CONCACAF Gold Cup players
1996 CONCACAF Gold Cup players
Expatriate soccer players in the United States
Edmonton Brick Men players
Hamilton Steelers (1981–1992) players
Major Indoor Soccer League (1978–1992) players
Tacoma Stars players
Vancouver Whitecaps (1986–2010) players
Canadian Soccer League (1987–1992) players
Western Soccer Alliance players
Canada Soccer Hall of Fame inductees